Knapton Cutting Butterfly Reserve is a   Local Nature Reserve (LNR) south of Knapton in Norfolk. It is owned and managed by North Norfolk District Council.

Knapton Cutting is a footpath from Knapton to North Walsham along the former North Walsham to Mundesley railway line. A short stretch at the northern end is the LNR, called Knapton Cutting Butterfly Reserve. It has a variety of flowering plants, including small-flowered catchfly, which is classified as endangered in Britain.

There is access from Hall Lane.

References

Local Nature Reserves in Norfolk